The 1895 Geneva Covenanters football team was an American football team that represented Geneva College as an independent during the 1895 college football season. Led by sixth-year head coach William McCracken, Geneva compiled a record of 0–5.

Schedule

References

Geneva
Geneva Golden Tornadoes football seasons
Geneva Covenanters football